Neuville-Coppegueule is a commune in the Somme department in Hauts-de-France in northern France.

Geography
The name comes from the French nickname for highwaymen from the forest of Argueil who operated on the Beauvais - Eu road.

Population

See also
Communes of the Somme department

References

Communes of Somme (department)